Courtis John Fuller (born 26 January 1957) is a news broadcaster in Cincinnati, Ohio, who is active in politics and in local community affairs. Fuller is an on-air personality at WLWT-TV. He was named "Cincinnati's Favorite TV Personality" by the Broadcast Hall of Fame.

In 2001, Fuller, a lifelong Democrat, ran as a Charterite candidate for the office of mayor of Cincinnati. The incumbent mayor was Charlie Luken, a former colleague of Fuller's in the WLWT newsroom. In the non-partisan primary election, Fuller managed a surprise first-place finish. However, in the general election, he received 45 percent of the vote to 55 percent by the incumbent Luken.

Fuller became the host of a radio talk show, returning to television news on WLWT in 2003.

He is a member of several community boards and commissions, including the Greater Cincinnati Tall Stacks Commission and the Cincinnati Symphony Orchestra Board of Trustees.

References

See also 
 Election Results, Mayor of Cincinnati, Ohio

Living people
Television anchors from Cincinnati
Ohio Democrats
Charter Party politicians
1957 births